Andrew Sacks  is the managing partner of the Philadelphia law firm Sacks Weston, LLC. Best known for litigating against companies that damage the environment or injure people, Sacks successfully helped secure a $1.06 billion verdict against ExxonMobil in 2001. The company was found guilty of polluting land with radioactive material and the case is the largest private landowner contamination case in U.S. history.

Legal background
After earning his Juris Doctor degree from Dickinson School of Law in 1984, Sacks officially began his legal career with a focus on personal injury. His talent for administration was quickly recognized and Sacks started managing numerous legal service plans for large labor unions, one of which was Lodge 5 of the Fraternal Order of Police. In total, Sacks oversaw a membership of more than 50,000 union members and their families.

While the firm continued to take on personal injury, medical malpractice, and maritime cases, the doors were also opened to plaintiffs in need of toxic tort and environmental contamination litigation representation.

In addition to the new practice areas, a satellite firm was established in New Orleans, LA. This enabled the firm to better serve clients whose land had been contaminated in Mississippi, Louisiana, Arkansas and Kentucky. As a pioneer in N.O.R.M. litigation, the firm's efforts resulted in the largest single-landowner verdict in the country's history. Sacks then went on to help settle a tobacco case for $1.25 billion and to help settle three cases in excess of $200 million with one at $50 million. Sacks Weston, LLC continues to handle complex litigation and other environmental and toxic tort matters. Later in his career, Sacks went on to represent corporate and governmental clients from Europe, Asia and South America in U.S. courts on matters including antitrust and RICO claims.

Sacks is admitted to practice in all Pennsylvania state courts, along with the U.S. District Court for the Eastern District of Pennsylvania and the U.S. Courts of Appeals for the Third and Sixth Circuits. Additionally, he is a member of the Bar of the Supreme Court of the United States. Five of his cases have gone before the Supreme Court to date. He is one of the few attorneys in the nation to have handled two cases where the results exceeded $1 billion. In 2015, he was admitted to the Billion Dollar Lawyers Association, a select group of attorneys and law firms with a history of recovering $1 billion or more in single or cumulative verdicts and settlements.

Education
Sacks received his BA from Grinnell College and his Juris Doctor from the Dickinson School of Law.

Lawsuits

ExxonMobil
Sacks was a participating attorney in the landmark verdict against ExxonMobil in 2001. A jury awarded his client $1.06 billion in damages for land polluted with radioactive material. The case is the largest private landowner contamination case in United States history.

Philip Morris
Sacks and legal partner John Weston were counsel in a case representing the Departments and Central Government of Colombia, which resulted in a $200 million settlement from Philip Morris.

Ashland Oil
Sacks was counsel in a case in which Ashland Oil paid $14 million to settle more than 5,000 third-party claims as well as damages, expenses, and cost of the settlement. The settlement included $11 million for cleanup, $5.25 million in legal and administrative fees to handle class-action suits, and $2.25 million in criminal fines paid for violations of the Federal Clean Water Act.

Personal life
Sacks has four children and three grandchildren and was a member of the board of directors of the Philadelphia Tri-State Chapter of the Lupus Foundation of America.
Andrew married socialite Brooke Dillon on October 29, 2016.

In November 2022, Andrew published his book of 50 years of photography titled “Life’s Portfolio” and dedicated it to his sister Amy Sacks who passed away from Lupus at 39. 50% of the proceeds from the sales of the book or pictures is being donated to the Lupus Foundation of America, Philadelphia Tri-State Chapter.

References

External links
 Sacks Weston, LLC website
 Vast Conspiracy Theory Takes Back Seat To Technical Arguments In RJ Reynolds Case
 https://www.andrewsacksphotos.com/

American environmental lawyers
Grinnell College alumni
Living people
Dickinson School of Law alumni
Year of birth missing (living people)